Return is a Korean-language EP by South Korean band F.T. Island, released on May 24, 2011. The album contains five songs, including the lead single "Hello Hello", which a music video was shot for.

Track listing

Charts

References

2011 EPs
Pop rock albums by South Korean artists
FNC Entertainment EPs
Genie Music EPs
F.T. Island EPs
Korean-language EPs